Mohammad Amam Hamimi is a former Governor of Logar Province in Afghanistan. He was governor from 10 March 2004 to December 2005. He was succeeded by Abdul Karim Matin as Ghazni governor in 2016.

References 

 

Governors of Logar Province
Living people
Year of birth missing (living people)